is a football (soccer) video game released on the Sega Genesis and Super Nintendo Entertainment System in 1993 and 1994, developed by Park Place Productions and published by Flying Edge and Acclaim.

The British, German and French releases featured pictures of Welsh international Ryan Giggs, Sepp Maier, and Paris Saint-Germain on the box respectively.

Modes of play included in the game are Exhibition Match (one player or two players) and Tournament Mode. Progress through the tournament can be saved via a password given at the end of each match. There are also options to turn fouls and offsides on or off, as well as selecting the amount of time allowed for the match to be played in.

Playable nations
There are 50 national teams in the game:

 
 
 
 
 
 
 
 
 
 
 
 
 
 
 
 
  (in the game appears under the  Flag of the United Kingdom)

Translation mistakes
If you set the game's language to German, the translation for "PENALTY" (penalty shootout) will be "SCHEISSEN" (to shit), which is a spelling mistake of "SCHIESSEN" (to shoot).

References

External links 
Champions World Class Soccer at MobyGames
Champions World Class Soccer (SNES) at GameFAQs
Champions World Class Soccer at games.softpedia

1993 video games
Acclaim Entertainment games
Association football video games
Super Nintendo Entertainment System games
Sega Genesis games
Multiplayer and single-player video games
Video games developed in the United States